Yu·Quan is a Chinese soft rock duet. They were founded in June 1998 as a duo between Chen Yufan (陈羽凡) and Hu Haiquan (胡海泉). They are from Beijing and Shenyang, Liaoning respectively. Both members were born in 1975. They were signed with Taiwanese music distributor Rock Records in 1999. Since then the duo has published a total of nine albums, with over seven million records sold. The duo is very well received in mainland China.

In 2013, the duo competed in the first season of Chinese reality TV show called I Am a Singer (renamed Singer since 2017); the duo won the competition, and the series saw a profound success. They tried to use their way to recall Chinese music among the young generation, and encourage Chinese young musicians to remember and rebuild Chinese music culture. They were previously appeared in the show Let's Sing Kids. As of 2020 season of Singer, they remained as the only group winners (and contestants doubled with hosting roles) to win, as winners from succeeding seasons were both soloists and singers not doubling roles as hosts.

They were mentors in the original composition show Sing My Song (2014–2015). During fall 2016, they were judges for music show Sound of My Dream. The show ran from November 2016 to January 2017. Before the show ended, Yu Quan held their seventh consecutive Christmas concert Tree New Bee.

Discography

Studio album

References

External links
yqzone.com: Official Forum and Website of Yuquan
Yu Quan on Sina Entertainment

Chinese pop music groups
Mandopop musical groups
Pop music duos